Yekaterina Aleksandrovna Gamova (born 17 October 1980) is a retired Russian volleyball player. She was a member of the Russian national team that won the gold medals at the 2006 and 2010 FIVB Volleyball Women's World Championships, and the silver medal in both the Athens 2004 and Sydney 2000 Olympic Games. Due to her stature and dominance at the net, she has been hailed as the "Queen of Volleyball". She is also the second highest paid female player in professional volleyball history. Her role was outside hitter/opposite.

Career
Playing with Dynamo Moscow she won the silver medal at the 2008–09 CEV Indesit Champions League, and she was awarded "Best Scorer".

For the 2009/2010 season, she joined the Turkish team Fenerbahçe Acıbadem. With this team she won the Turkish League Championship and went to the 2010 CEV Indesit Champions League Final Four. Her team finished in the second place after being defeated by Volley Bergamo and she was awarded "Best Scorer".

She was a member of the Russia national team that won the 2010 World Championship and was named the Most Valuable Player of the event.

After the defeat in the quarterfinals by Brazil in the 2012 Olympics she is considering quitting playing with the national team but still continuing playing at club level. "I will take a break with the national team. I don't know if it will be a permanent leave, or if I will resume after a long pause."

Gamova won with the Russian club Dinamo Kazan the 2013–14 CEV Champions League held in Baku, Azerbaijan, defeating 3–0 the home owners Rabita Baku in the semifinals and 3–0 to the Turkish VakıfBank İstanbul in the final. She was awarded tournament's Most Valuable Player and Best Scorer.

Gamova won the gold medal in the 2014 FIVB Club World Championship, when her team defeated 3–0 to the Brazilian club Molico Osasco for the championship match. She was named the Best Opposite Spiker and Most Valuable Player among the championship Best Team.

In May 2016, Gamova announced on Match TV and on her Facebook page that she wants to retire from her sports career because of an injury. With that said, she won't participate at the 2016 Summer Olympics.

Family
After the Olympics in London on 17 August 2012, she married the Russian cinematographer and producer Mikhail Mukasei, son of Svetlana Druzhinina and Anatoly Mukasei.

Clubs
  Avtodor-Metar (1996–1998)
  Uralochka-NTMK 2 (1998–2000)
  Uralochka-NTMK (2000–2003)
  Dynamo Moscow (2003–2009)
  Fenerbahçe Acıbadem (2009–2010)
  Dinamo Kazan (2010–2016)

Awards

Government
 Merited Master of Sports of Russia (2000)
 Medal of the Order "For Merit to the Fatherland" II class (19 April 2001) — for the huge contribution to the development of physical culture and sports, and for the huge sports destinations at the XXVII Summer Olympics in Sydney in 2000
 Medal of the Order "For Merit to the Fatherland" I class (3 October 2006) — for the huge contribution to the development of physical culture and sports, and for sports destinations
 Decoration of Honour for Services in the Development of Physical Culture and Sports (28 April 2016)

Individuals
 2000 FIVB World Grand Prix "Best Blocker"
 2003 FIVB World Grand Prix "Best Scorer"
 2004 Olympic Games "Best Scorer"
 2006 FIVB World Grand Prix "Best Scorer"
 2007 European Championship "Best Scorer"
 2008–09 CEV Indesit Champions League Final Four "Best Scorer"
 2009–10 CEV Indesit Champions League Final Four "Best Scorer"
 2010 FIVB World Championship "Most Valuable Player"
 2013–14 CEV Champions League "Most Valuable Player"
 2013–14 CEV Champions League "Best Scorer"
 2014 FIVB Club World Championship "Most Valuable Player"
 2014 FIVB Club World Championship "Best Opposite Spiker"

National team

Junior
 1999 Junior World Championship – Gold Medal

Senior
 1999 World Grand Prix – Gold Medal
 1999 FIVB World Cup – Silver Medal
 2006 World Championship – Gold Medal
 2010 World Championship – Gold Medal

Clubs
 1998, 1999, Russian League Championship –   Champion, with Uralochka-NTMK 2
 2000, 2001, 2002, Russian League Championship –   Champion, with Uralochka-NTMK
 2005, 2007, 2009 Russian Championship –  Champion, with Dynamo Moscow
 2009–2010 Turkish League Championship –  Champion, with Fenerbahçe Acıbadem
 2009–2010 Turkish Cup Championship –   Champion, with Fenerbahçe Acıbadem
 2009–2010 Turkish Super Cup Championship –  Champion, with Fenerbahçe Acıbadem
 2010–2011 Russian Cup – Champion, with Dinamo Kazan
 2013–14 CEV Champions League -  Champion, with Dinamo Kazan
 2014 FIVB Club World Championship –  Champion, with Dinamo Kazan

See also
List of tall women
Russia women's national volleyball team
Women's volleyball at the 2004 Summer Olympics

References

External links

 FIVB Profile
 Fenerbahce Acibadem Women's Volleyball Team
 Uralochka VC profile
 Gamova's photos

1980 births
Living people
Russian expatriate sportspeople in Turkey
Russian women's volleyball players
Expatriate volleyball players in Turkey
Fenerbahçe volleyballers
Olympic volleyball players of Russia
Volleyball players at the 2000 Summer Olympics
Volleyball players at the 2004 Summer Olympics
Volleyball players at the 2008 Summer Olympics
Olympic silver medalists for Russia
Sportspeople from Chelyabinsk
Olympic medalists in volleyball
Volleyball players at the 2012 Summer Olympics
Medalists at the 2004 Summer Olympics
Medalists at the 2000 Summer Olympics
20th-century Russian women
21st-century Russian women